Breznik is a small settlement northwest of Dragatuš in the Municipality of Črnomelj in the White Carniola area of southeastern Slovenia. The area is part of the traditional region of Lower Carniola and is now included in the Southeast Slovenia Statistical Region.

There is a 16th-century mansion known as Turn Mansion south of the village.

References

External links

Breznik on Geopedia

Populated places in the Municipality of Črnomelj